Road–rail bridges are bridges shared by road and rail lines. Road and rail may be segregated so that trains may operate at the same time as cars (e.g., the Sydney Harbour Bridge). The rail track can be above the roadway or vice versa with truss bridges. Road and rail may share the same carriageway so that road traffic must stop when the trains operate (like a level crossing), or operate together like a tram in a street (street running).

Road–rail bridges are sometimes called combined bridges.

Afghanistan 

 Afghanistan–Uzbekistan Friendship Bridge between Termez and Jeyretan.

Argentina 
 Transandine Railway rail tunnel converted to road use for time being, albeit single lane.
Zárate–Brazo Largo Bridge
San Roque González de Santa Cruz Bridge, between Posadas, Argentina, and Encarnación, Paraguay.

Australia

Current 
 Sydney Harbour Bridge, Sydney, New South Wales now with parallel tunnel.
 Narrows Bridge, Perth, Western Australia
 Mount Henry Bridge, Perth, Western Australia
 Bridgewater Bridge, Hobart, Tasmania
 Burdekin Bridge, Queensland
 Bylong Tunnel used for single lane road, until railway completed 
 Dickabram Bridge, Queensland
 Grafton Bridge, New South Wales – lifting span out of use. Also carries large water main instead of second railway track.
 Septimus, Queensland – Head-Menkens Road – Cane tram
 Swan River Bridge at Fremantle proposed to be rebuilt as combined bridge after flood damage; 1926.
 Bloomfield Coal Loop over New England Highway near Thornton

Former 

 Menindee, New South Wales – separated in the 1970s.
 Penrith, New South Wales – separated in 1907.
 Pyrmont Bridge, Sydney, New South Wales (carried road traffic until 1984; carried Sydney Monorail 1988–2013).
 Tocumwal, New South Wales – separated in the 1980s.
 Murray Bridge, South Australia
 Paringa Bridge, South Australia (1927)
 Echuca (Victoria) –Moama (NSW), opened in 1879, road only since new rail-only bridge opened in 1989.
 Gonn Crossing, 1926, on the Kerang-Stony Crossing (NSW) railway line. Road only since the rail line closed in 1964.
 Robinvale, Victoria, 1927, as part of the Lette railway line. Road only after construction of the line was abandoned in 1943. Replaced by a new road bridge in 2006.
 Camden, NSW, Rail bridge attached to the road bridge until branch closure in the 1960s.
 North Richmond NSW, Rail bridge attached to the road bridge on the Kurrajong Line until branch closure in 1952.
 Lapstone Viaduct NSW, rail viaduct on The Little Zig Zag converted to road traffic after the realignment of the Railway.

Bangladesh 
 Jamuna Bridge
 Padma Bridge

Botswana
 Kazungula Bridge

Brazil 
 Rollemberg–Vuolo Road–Railway Bridge over Paraná River
 Mixed Bridge of Marabá over Tocantins River

Bulgaria 
 Vidin, Bulgaria – Calafat, Romania – 2013 single track
 Danube bridge to Romania

Cameroon 
 Wouri River bridge, in Douala – almost unserviceable because of poor condition
 Bonabéri–Douala over Wouri River estuary

Canada 
Alberta
 High Level Bridge, Edmonton

British Columbia
 Derwent Way Bridge, Delta–New Westminster
 Mission Railway Bridge, Mission–Abbotsford; Rail only since the opening of the road only Mission Bridge

Nova Scotia
 Canso Canal Bridge, Port Hastings

Ontario
 Alexandra Bridge, Ottawa until the tracks were removed
 Prince Edward Viaduct, Toronto since 1966 when the subway was commissioned on the lower deck
 Whirlpool Rapids Bridge, Niagara Falls, Ontario, carries passenger rail on the upper level, commuter autos on the lower level between Ontario and New York

Québec
 Victoria Bridge, Montreal
 Quebec Bridge, Québec City
 The new Champlain Bridge when the Réseau électrique métropolitain will be installed

Saskatchewan
 St. Louis Bridge – 1915 rail only; 1928 road–rail; 1983; road only.
 Canadian Northern Railway Bridge (Prince Albert) – 1909–1960 road–rail; 1960 rail only;
 also a swing bridge 1909–1939
 Crooked Bridge – 1930
 CPR Bridge (Saskatoon) rail 1908; rail and pedestrian 1909

China (mainland)

Current 
Binbei railway Songhua River road-railway bridge (6-lane highway and Harbin–Bei'an railway)
Caiyuanba Bridge (6-lane highway and CRT line 3)
Chaotianmen Bridge (6-lane highway and CRT loop line)
Daxie Bridge
Dingshan Bridge (G212 and CRT line 5)
Dongshuimen Yangtze River Bridge (4-lane highway and CRT line 6)
Ganjiang Bridge (2-lane road and Beijing–Kowloon railway)
Hengyang Xiang River Road-Railway Bridge (Guangdong Road, Daqing Road and Hunan–Guangxi railway)
Huainan Huaihe Bridge
Huanggang Yangtze River Bridge (S38 and Wuhuang ICR)
Husutong Yangtze River Bridge (S19, Nantong–Shanghai railway and Tongsujiayong HSR (planned))
Jingyuan Yellow River Road-Railway bridge (road and Honghui Railway)
Jingzhou Yangtze River Road-Railway Bridge (G351, S61 and Haoji Railway)
Jiujiang Yangtze River Bridge (G105 and Jingjiu railway)
Nanjing Yangtze River Bridge (G104 and Beijing–Shanghai railway)
Pingtan Road-Railway Bridge (G3 and Fuping railway)
Qiansimen Bridge (4-lane highway and CRT line 6)
Qiantang River Bridge
Second Qiantang River Bridge (road and Hukun railway, temporary closed for renovation)
Sino-Korean Friendship Bridge
Third Wuhu Yangtze River Bridge (8-lane highway, Shanghang HSR and Wuhu Rail Transit line 1)
Tianxingzhou Yangtze River Bridge (G316, Third Ring Road, Jingguang HSR and Wuhan freight bypass)
Tongling Yangtze River Road-Railway Bridge (S30, Hefu HSR and Lujiang–Tongling railway)
Wanghe Bridge
Wufengshan Yangtze River Bridge (S39 and Lianzhen HSR)
Wuhan Yangtze River Bridge (G107, Inner Ring Road and Beijing–Guangzhou railway)
Wuhu Yangtze River Bridge (G5011, G329 and Huainan railway)
Xinglin Bridge (6-lane highway and Fuzhou–Xiamen railway)
Yudong Yangtze River Bridge (G210 and CRT line 2)
Zhaoqing Xi River Bridge (G324 and Guangzhou–Maoming railway)
Zhicheng Yangtze River Bridge (S225 and Jiaozuo–Liuzhou railway)
Zhengxin Yellow River Bridge (S227 and Jingguang HSR)
Zhujiang Bridge (Zhongshan Road and Guangzhou–Maoming railway)

Former 
Binbei Bridge (was a part of G202 and Harbin–Bei'an railway, road part closed in 2006, railway part closed and replaced by another bridge in 2016)
Songpu Bridge (railway part abandoned, and replaced by Jinshan railway Huangpu River Bridge, still used by G320)

Czech Republic 
 Bechyně. In 1928 a bridge was constructed to carry the railway line and road from Tábor into Bechyně. Previously the line had stopped on the other side of a deep gorge from the town and access was by way of a steep road and narrow bridge. The rail line runs in the roadway for 100 m and traffic stopped by lights as for a grade crossing.

Democratic Republic of the Congo 

 Kongolo Bridge
   Brazzaville–Kinshasa Bridge – proposed 
 Matadi Bridge – railway yet to be used. Built 1983. Angola would like to use this bridge to reach their exclave of Cabinda.

Denmark 
 Great Belt Fixed Link, the Western Bridge.
 Little Belt Bridge
 Øresund Bridge
 Masnedsund Bridge
 Storstrøm Bridge – A replacement bridge is under constriction, also road-rail, will have the same name
 King Frederik IX Bridge
 King Christian X Bridge in Sønderborg, railway closed.
 Oddesund Bridge
 Hadsund Bridge, railway closed, bridge replaced.

Egypt 
 Proposed road-rail tunnel under Suez Canal
 Suez Canal road rail bridge at El Hammad

Estonia 
 Papiniidu Bridge, Pärnu

Fiji 
On Viti Levu the CSR Company was obliged to provide road-rail bridges when it built bridges for the Cane Trains to their sugar mills, e.g. the two largest bridges over the Ba and Sigatoka Rivers. Many are now rail-only as separate road bridges has been built.
 The Ba Bridge (550 ft; 170 m) has 19 spans, 17 standard spans (30 ft; 9 m) and a short span at each end, and has been rail-only for many years. The Sigatoka Bridge (810 ft; 245 m) has 27 spans. Both bridges are prone to hurricane damage due to extra flow of water; the Ba Bridge often disappears under water but is not always damaged (see Cane Trains).
 Sigatoka Bridge was washed away by storms, January 2009.

Finland
Ounaskoski bridge
Bridge in Keminmaa

France 
 Cize-Bolozon viaduct on the Ligne du Haut-Bugey built 1882, destroyed by the maquis in 1945, rebuilt 1950
 Pont Morand, Lyon
 Pont de Recouvrance, Brest – road & tramway – includes lifting span

Germany 
 Fehmarn Sound bridge
 Lindaunis Bridge
 Kattwykbrücke - Hamburg, new railroad bridge being built next to existing bridge, opening December 2020
 Moselbrücke Bullay – double deck road and rail bridge
 Oberbaumbrücke
 
 Rügendamm
 Elbbrücke Lauenburg

Wartime 
 Remagen on River Rhine

Ghana 
 Unknown location with YouTube movie

Guatemala 
 Puente Rodolfo Robles

Hong Kong

Current 
Lantau Link
Tsing Ma Bridge (longest bridge span for road and rail traffic in the world) 
Ma Wan Viaduct
Kap Shui Mun Bridge
  across Tuen Mun River estuary
 Kai Fuk Road Flyover/Kwun Tong line viaduct between Ngau Tau Kok and Kowloon Bay stations
 Kwun Tong Road over Tsui Ping Nullah
 Castle Peak Road—Hung Shui Kiu over Hung Shui Kiu River
 Ma On Shan Road/Ma On Shan Rail (now part of Tuen Ma line) over Tai Shui Hang/Nui Po Tung Hang
 Tsing Kwai Highway, Tung Chung line and Airport Express (road and four tracks of rapid transit) - two stretches
 Yuen Long Main Road over Yuen Long Creek (Yuen Long Nullah)

Former 
Bowrington Bridge, part of Hennessy Road across Bowrington Canal
 Sha Tau Kok Railway and Sha Tau Kok Road - bridges over Ma Wat River, Tan Shan River and Kwan Tei River

Hungary 
 Bridge over the Tisza near Kisköre
 Türr István híd over the Danube near Baja

India 
 Bogibeel bridge, Assam

Digha–Sonpur bridge, Bihar
Godavari Bridge, Andhra Pradesh
Naranarayan Setu, Assam
Saraighat Bridge, Assam
Koilwar Bridge, Bihar
Rajendra Setu, Bihar
Munger Ganga Bridge, Bihar
Farakka Barrage, West Bengal
Vivekananda Setu, West Bengal
Strachey Bridge, Agra, Uttar Pradesh
Old Naini Bridge, Allahabad
Old Yamuna Bridge, Delhi
Malaviya Bridge, Varanasi Over Ganga in U.P.

Indonesia 
  – opened in 1893

Iraq 
 River Tigris in Baghdad – 1950

Italy

Current 
 Mezzanacorti bridge over the Po on the Milan–Genoa railway
 San Michele bridge over the Adda on the Seregno–Bergamo railway
 Sesto Calende bridge over the Ticino on the Domodossola–Milan railway
 Soleri viaduct in Cuneo
 Turbigo bridge over the Ticino on the Saronno–Novara railway
 Valenza bridge over the Po on the Pavia–Alessandria railway
 Ponte della Libertà in Venice
 Vigevano bridge over the Ticino on the Milan–Mortara railway

Former 
 Adenige bridge on temporary Mont Cenis Railway
 Magenta bridge over the Ticino on the Turin–Milan railway
 Revere bridge over the Po on the Verona–Bologna railway
 San Nicolò bridge over the Trebbia on the Alessandria–Piacenza railway

Japan

Current 
 Great Seto Bridge, JR Shikoku Honshi-bisan Line and Seto-Chuo Expressway
 Kansai International Airport Access Bridge (Sky Gate Bridge R), JR West, Nankai Railway and 6-lane expressway
 , between Kobe Airport and Port Island, carrying the Port Liner
 Murayama Bridge, Nagano Electric Railway and National Route 406
 Rainbow Bridge, Yurikamome and Shuto Expressway Daiba Route (route 11)
 Rokko Bridge, Rokko Island Line and 4-lane road
 Shin Yodogawa Bridge, Osaka Metro Midosuji Line and National Route 423
 Shin-Kuzuryu Bridge, Hokuriku Shinkansen (railway under construction) and Fukui Prefectural Route 268
 Tatsunokuchi Bridge, Sendai Subway Tozai Line and 2-lane road
 Tatsupi Bridge, Tama Toshi Monorail Line and Tokyo Prefectural Route 149

Former 
  – Azumabashi Line closed in 1972
 Inuyama Bridge – separated in 2000.
  – Umayabashi Line closed in 1971

North Korea 
 Sino-Korean Friendship Bridge
 Korea Russia Friendship Bridge

South Korea 
Cheongdam Bridge
Dongho Bridge
Dongjak Bridge
Yeongjong Bridge

Laos 
 First Thai–Lao Friendship Bridge

Macau 
 Ponte de Sai Van (space reserved for a rail-link in future)

Mexico 
 Puente Rodolfo Robles

Mozambique 
 The Dona Ana Bridge has carried rail and road traffic, but not at the same time.

Myanmar 
 Mu River
 Ye River – 240m
 Thanlwin Bridge in Moulmein, which is 2400m long

New Zealand 

A 1930 report listed 33 bridges and estimated that the cost of bridge-keepers, extra maintenance for the decks, etc. amounted to £15,500 a year, as against £4,307 paid to NZR.

Current 
 Alexandra – Manuherikia River, Central Otago Line – single level, shared deck (rail closed)
Okahukura – Stratford–Okahukura Line between Taumarunui and Ohura – two level, road under rail 1933-2009 (rail disused)
 Taramakau River – Ross Branch – single level, shared deck
 Hindon, New Zealand – Taieri Gorge Railway – single level – converted from rail only
 Sutton, near Middlemarch, New Zealand – Taieri Gorge Railway – single level
 Napier – Palmerston North – Gisborne Line – single level, separate decks (road closed)
 Inangahua – Stillwater–Ngawakau Line – single level, separate decks

 Arahura, near Hokitika – Ross Branch – single level, separate decks (replaced single level, shared deck bridge)
 Seddon – Main North Line over Awatere River – two level, single lane road under rail (road closed in November 2007); see picture above of Coastal Pacific crossing the bridge in April 2007

Former 
 Arahura River – between Greymouth and Hokitika – single level – replaced in 2009
 Blackball combined over Grey River
 Huntly 1915–1959 (now rail/footbridge only) over Waikato River
 Pekatahi – between Edgecumbe and Taneatua – single level, shared deck – track removed in 2017
 Rakaia – separated in 1939
 Waitaki – separated around the late 1950s

Whanganui River near Taumarunui. Replaced by new road bridge up-stream from combined rail road bridge in 1960s.

Temporary 
 Wairoa River – due to road bridge washaway 2008

Nigeria 
 River Benue road rail bridge at Makurdi

Norway 
 Rødberg Bridge carried the now closed Numedal Line to its terminus in Rødberg and the highway continuing to Geilo over Upsetelva in the center of Rødberg. The rails are still in place, covered by tarmac. There has been no rail traffic on Numedalsbanen since 1988. The railway is in the road, so car traffic had to stop when trains were passing.
 Bruhaug Bridge, also on Numedal Line carried both the railway and local car traffic over the river Numedalslågen. The road surface is wood.
 Hølendalen Bridge, near Moss. Motorway and railway, parallel separate bridges.
 Nygård Bridge in Bergen carries both the Bergen Light Rail and a street. A parallel bridge carries European Route E39.

Pakistan 
Railway Track under Metro Bus Track on Gate of Rawalpindi City near Marirh Chowk Muree Road Rawalpindi

Paraguay 
 See above for the cross-border bridge to Argentina

Philippines 

 Guadalupe Bridge in the Makati-Mandaluyong border over the Pasig River. The rail bridge of Line 3 is above the road bridge carrying EDSA.

Portugal 
 25 de Abril Bridge
 Pocinho Bridge in Vila Nova de Foz Côa (closed)
 Ponte Eiffel
 Ponte de Jafafe in Sernada do Vouga single level bridge over Vouga River used by Linha do Vouga
 Ponte Luís I
 Ponte de Valença in Valença, Portugal over Minho (river) used by Ramal Internacional de Valença

Romania 
 Vidin, Bulgaria – Calafat, Romania – 2013 single track
 Danube bridge to Bulgaria
 Bridge over the Siret river

Russia 
 Khabarovsk Bridge over the Amur River
 Komsomolsk-on-Amur Bridge over the Amur River
 Nizhny Novgorod over River Oka
 Crimean Bridge over Kerch Strait

Serbia 
 Ada Bridge 
 Pančevo Bridge
 Road–Railway Bridge 
 Žeželj Bridge
 Rača Bridge 
 Orlovat Bridge 
 Titel Bridge

Slovakia 
 Prístavný most (Harbour Bridge) over Danube river from Bratislava center to Petržalka district

South Africa 
 Buffalo River at East London harbour (double-deck bridge)
 Umkomaas, KZN south coast
 Port Shepstone, KZN south coast
 Caledon River at Maseru
 Fairy Knowe (Wilderness)
 Qamata
 Tugela (at one time, many years ago)

Sri Lanka 
 Manampitiya Bridge over the Mahaweli River – This narrow bridge is used only for rail since 2006.
 Oddamavadi Bridge (Valaichchenai Bridge) across Valaichchenai lagoon in Eastern Province – Railway-only since April 2010

Sweden 
 Øresund Bridge – 8 km long two-level bridge. Road (four lane) on top, rail (two tracks) below.
 A few narrow same-track combined road-rail bridges:
 in Oxberg
 in Sveg
 north of Moskosel.
 in Kristianstad (industry railway, road in the same track)
 in Norrköping (industry railway, road next to the rail)
 Traneberg Bridge – in Stockholm, combined road and subway/metro rail bridge.
 Skanstull Bridge – in Stockholm, combined road and subway/metro rail bridge.
 Lidingöbron – 1 km long parallel road and rail (two separate bridges). The road bridge was built 1971; before that the old bridge had road and double track railway in the same carriageway.

Switzerland
The Bernina railway shares a bridge over the River Poschiavino at Campocologno just north of the Swiss-Italian border.

Both railways operated by Aare Seeland Mobil go over three combined bridges each. Four of these bridges cross the Aare river, one crosses a highway.

Thailand

Current 
First Thai–Lao Friendship Bridge

Former 
Chulachomklao Bridge
Chulalongkorn Bridge
Rama VI Bridge (separated in 2003)

Turkey 

Gülüşkür Bridge - Crosses the Keban Dam in eastern Turkey. 
Yavuz Sultan Selim Bridge - Crosses the Bosphorus Straight, north of Istanbul. The bridge opened in 2016 with space allocated for a double-track railway which is still under construction.

Uganda 
 Jinja

Ukraine 
 Pivdennyi Bridge, Kyiv Metro Syretsko-Pecherska line and E40

United Kingdom

Current 

 Ashton Swing Bridge Preston. Crosses Preston Dock lock. Road traffic and pedestrians controlled by barriers from the lock control room. Still used by The Ribble Steam Railway and tour trains visiting from the main line, still running in 2012 the bridge is used for delivery of bitumen by railway to the Preston Total Bitumen plant. On arrival from Total's oil refinery in Immingham, North Lincolnshire, the tankers are parked at the exchange sidings. The steam railway staff divide the trains and shunt the tankers into Total Bitumen's siding for the bitumen processing and distribution plant, later reforming the trains for their return journey to Immingham. 
 Britannia Bridge Robert Stephenson's famous, formerly 'tubular' railway bridge across the Menai Strait in Wales. Rebuilt as a road and rail bridge after a major fire in 1970.
 High Level Bridge Newcastle upon Tyne.
 King George V Bridge, Keadby, North Lincolnshire. Carries the A18 and the Doncaster–Scunthorpe railway across the River Trent. Opened in 1916, Althorpe railway station is on the western bank of the Trent, very close to the bridge, which has not lifted for some years.
 Belfast cross-harbour bridge, opened 1994–1995. See The Motorway Archive
 Kingsferry road and rail bridge, Isle of Sheppey. Built in 1960, until 2006 this was the only road crossing to the island. The bridge opens 20 times each day.
 Porthmadog, Wales, on the Welsh Highland Railway, Shared by this narrow gauge line and the main road through the town.
 Pont Briwet, over River Dwyryd, near Penrhyndeudraeth, North Wales – single track rail of the Cambrian Coast Line, beside wide single-carriageway road; re-opened in summer 2015 after major repairs.

Former 
 Connel Bridge, near Oban, Scotland, was shared until the railway closed in the 1960s. A cantilever bridge.
 Ashton Avenue Bridge, Bristol road rail swing bridge.
 Queen Alexandra Bridge, still in road (A1231) use across the River Wear between Deptford and Southwick in Sunderland, mineral railway abandoned in 1921 after 12 years' use.
 Newhaven Harbour, East Sussex, swing bridge standard gauge harbour branch shared with main coast road to Brighton, closed about 1962.
 Runcorn Railway Bridge – rail; pedestrian bridge alongside was open until 1965.
Cross Keys Bridge, on the Norfolk /Lincolnshire border, both sides now in use for road traffic. Swing Bridge

United States 
Alaska
 Anton Anderson Memorial Tunnel - a road-rail tunnel

California
 I Street Bridge carries two tracks of Amtrak/Union Pacific Railroad and two lanes of State Route 16 between Sacramento and West Sacramento.
 San Francisco–Oakland Bay Bridge carried two tracks of Key System between San Francisco and Oakland from 1936 until 1963.
 Mare Island Causeway is a lift bridge that links Mare Island to Vallejo, California, carrying a railroad track and a street.
Pit River Bridge across Lake Shasta- 4 lanes of Interstate 5 and also Union Pacific Railroad

Florida
 Acosta Bridge – Carries two monorail tracks for the JTA Skyway and six lanes of State Road 13 in Jacksonville.

Illinois
 Lake Street Bridge – rail on upper deck (CTA Green & Pink Line) road on lower deck, bascule bridge.
 McKinley Bridge – rail removed in 1978.
 Wells Street Bridge – rail on upper deck (CTA Brown & Purple Line Express), road on lower deck, bascule bridge.

Iowa – Illinois
 Fort Madison Toll Bridge – rail on lower deck, road on upper deck
 Government Bridge – rail on upper deck, road on lower deck, swing-span bridge
 Keokuk Rail Bridge – rail on lower deck, disused road on upper deck, swing-span bridge above Lock and Dam No. 19.

 Kentucky
 Kentucky & Indiana Terminal Bridge – Truss bridge between Louisville, Kentucky and New Albany, Indiana over the Ohio River. Road portion closed in 1979 when roadway collapsed under an overweight truck.

Louisiana
 Almonaster Avenue Bridge – Bascule drawbridge in New Orleans, Louisiana
 Florida Avenue Bridge – Vertical lift drawbridge in New Orleans, Louisiana
 Huey P. Long Bridge – Truss bridge in Jefferson Parish, Louisiana.
 Huey P. Long Bridge – Truss bridge in Baton Rouge, Louisiana.
 St. Claude Avenue Bridge – former road and rail bridge, nowadays it serves automotive and pedestrian traffic. New Orleans

Massachusetts
 Longfellow Bridge – Four lane road with the MBTA Red Line in the median of the bridge connecting Boston and Cambridge over the Charles River.

Michigan
 Portage Lake Lift Bridge connecting Hancock and Houghton. The world's heaviest and largest double deck vertical lift bridge. 4-lane road on upper deck, rail on lower deck (converted to trail). The lower deck was also paved so the bridge could be placed in an intermediate position to allow road traffic only.

Minnesota
 Camp Ripley Bridge
 Oliver Bridge connecting Duluth, Minnesota and Oliver, Wisconsin. Rail on upper deck, road on lower deck.
 Washington Avenue Bridge – in Minneapolis across the Mississippi River. Opened in 1965, rail (Green Line light rail) added in 2011.

Missouri
 Second Hannibal Bridge in Kansas City, Missouri across the Missouri River. Opened in 1917, had a road deck until 1956, when another bridge was built, but the rail deck is presently in use. Evidence of the road deck is still plainly visible.
ASB Bridge in Kansas City, Missouri, across the Missouri River. Opened in 1911, it carried vehicular traffic until 1987, when new span was built. Bridge is unique that lower part is a vertical lift drawbridge, while without interrupting traffic on the upper deck.
 Eads Bridge in St. Louis, Missouri across the Mississippi River. Opened in 1874. It carries the road traffic on the upper deck and the St. Louis MetroLink on the lower deck.

New York
 Broadway Bridge – Road and the IRT Broadway–Seventh Avenue Line of the New York City Subway
 Brooklyn Bridge – A road bridge that also carried elevated rapid transit service until 1944
 Queensboro Bridge – A road bridge that also carried elevated rapid transit service until the early 1940s.
 Railroad St. Bridge – Rome, New York – Railroad St. and Mohawk, Adirondack and Northern Railroad share right-of-way on bridge.
 Roosevelt Avenue (Flushing River) Bridge - double deck bascule span with IRT Flushing Line elevated line on upper level and Roosevelt Avenue on lower level over Flushing River, completed 1928
 Williamsburg Bridge – Road and the BMT Nassau Street Line of the New York City Subway
 Whirlpool Rapids Bridge, Niagara Falls, New York, carries passenger rail on the upper level, commuter autos on the lower level between Ontario and New York

Ohio
 Clay Wade Bailey Bridge/C&O Railroad Bridge – Cincinnati to Newport, Kentucky over the Ohio River. (Technically, these are two separate bridges, but they are spaced very closely adjacent to each other and built on common piers.)

Oregon
 Steel Bridge – A through truss, double lift bridge across the Willamette River in Portland, Oregon Carrying pedestrian, rail, automobile, bus, and MAX Light Rail, making it one of the most multi-modal bridges in the world.

Pennsylvania
 Benjamin Franklin Bridge – Suspension bridge carrying I-676 and PATCO Speedline trains between Philadelphia, Pennsylvania, and Camden, New Jersey.

Tennessee-Arkansas
 Harahan Bridge (formerly) - Through truss bridge across the Mississippi River connecting Memphis, Tennessee to West Memphis, Arkansas. Built for two railroad tracks and two one-lane "wagonways" cantilevered outside the through truss. Vehicular traffic moved to Memphis & Arkansas Bridge in 1949; though the original decks on both "wagonways" were removed, one of them was rebuilt for pedestrian/bicycle use in 2016.

Virginia
 High Bridge (Appomattox River)

Uzbekistan 
 Amu Darya Bridge is the first bridge between Khorezm and Karakalpakstan, opened March 2004. It only has one track with the rails embedded into tarmac, used for trains and cars, one direction at a time, and is 681 m long. It now doubles the pontoon bridge that was the only link between Khorezm and the rest of Uzbekistan.
 See above for the cross-border bridge to Afghanistan

Venezuela 
 Second Orinoco crossing

Vietnam 
 Long Biên Bridge

Zambia 
Victoria Falls Bridge

Zimbabwe
Beitbridge until 1995.
Victoria Falls Bridge

Temporary 
During wartime and other emergencies, rail tracks on bridges are sometimes paved to allow road traffic to proceed. Examples include the Ludendorff Bridge at Remagen bridge in Germany.

After a landslide on the Stromeferry road in Scotland in 2012, a 150m section of the parallel railway was paved with rubber tiles to allow road traffic to avoid a 250 km detour.

Proposed 
  Italy – Messina Bridge
   Republic of the Congo – Democratic Republic of the Congo – Brazzaville-Kinshasa Bridge
   Yemen – Djibouti – Bridge of the Horns
   Botswana – Zambia – Kazungula bridge – 2010
  Sunda Strait – Indonesia
  Venezuela – Nigale Bridge ( Maracaibo Lake )
   Qatar–Bahrain Friendship Bridge for road and rail will be connecting Bahrain and Qatar.

Under construction 
 Bangladesh – Padma bridge
 China – Baijusi Yangtze River Bridge (8-lane highway and CRT line 18)
 China – Changtai Yangtze River Bridge (S30 and Taichang ICR)
 China – Guojiatuo Yangtze River Bridge (8-lane road and CRT line 8)
 China – Humen Road-Railway Bridge (road and Shenzhan HSR)
 China – Libu Yangtze River Road-Railway Bridge (G55 and Jingyue ICR)
 China – Lingang Yangtze River Bridge (road and Chuannan ICR)
 China – Linyu Yangtze River Bridge (road and Line 1 of Luzhou Rail Transit)
 China – Ma'anshan Yangtze River Road-Railway Bridge (6-lane highway and Chaoma ICR)
 China – Taichang Yangtze River Bridge (Ruchang Expressway and Taichang ICR)
 China – Tongling Yangtze River road-railway Bridge of G3 (G3, Hewen HSR and Tongling Rail Transit)
 Taiwan - Danjiang Bridge ( light rail cross)

See also
List of bridges
List of road–rail tunnels
List of bridge–tunnels
Street running
Train ferry

References

 
Lists of bridges
Lists of roads
Rail transport-related lists
Road infrastructure